Cioban (/tʃo'ban/) is a Romanian surname meaning "shepherd". It is derived from the Persian Çoban. Notable people with the surname include:

 Denis Cioban (born 1985), Moldovan road bicycle racer
 Mitrofan Cioban (1942–2021), Moldovan mathematician

See also 
 Ciobanu (surname)
 Juhász

Occupational surnames
Romanian-language surnames